The Henry Lawson Way is a  sealed rural road that links Forbes, situated on the Newell Highway, to Young, situated on the Olympic Highway in the central western region of New South Wales, Australia.

The road is named in honour of Henry Lawson (1867 – 1922), an Australian writer and poet, who was born in a town on the Grenfell goldfields, located adjacent to the modern-day rural road.

Route
The road commences in Forbes at a junction with the Gooloogong-Forbes Road (Lachlan Valley Way). The concurrent road heads east into the town of Grenfell, where the concurrency terminates as the Henry Lawson Way heads south (on Weddin Street) towards Young through highly undulating countryside. It reaches its terminus (as Iandra Street) at a junction with the Olympic Highway.

Major intersections

See also

 Highways in Australia
 List of highways in New South Wales

References

Highways in New South Wales
Central West (New South Wales)